"The Fruitsmelling Shop" is a song by Irish musician Sonny Condell with band Scullion. It was released in 1979 as a single by Mulligan Music and distributed by Polygram Records, with "Down in the City" as its B-side. Although single is introduced as a solo work on its front sleeve, "The Fruitsmelling Shop" comes actually from the eponymous first Scullion album, while "Down in the City" is taken from the first Condell's solo album, Camouflage, published in 1977.
The lyrics are excerpted from the 10th episode, "The Wandering Rocks", of the James Joyce's Ulysses novel.

Format and track listing

Personnel

"The Fruitsmelling Shop"
Scullion
 Sonny Condell – vocals, piano, saxophone
 Greg Boland – backing vocals, acoustic guitar
 Philip King – backing vocals
Additional musicians
 Peter Browne – uilleann pipes
 Rita Connolly – vocals
Production
 P.J. Curtis – production
 Philip Begley – engineering
 Paul Thomas, Steve Morris – engineering assistants

"Down in the City"
 Sonny Condell – acoustic guitar, vocals
 Jolyon Jackson – cello
 Greg Boland – acoustic guitar
 Fran Breen – percussion
 Ciarán Brennan – double bass
Production
 Shaun Davey – production
 Brian Materson – engineering

References

1979 singles
1977 songs